Bryan Madorsky is a former child actor from Canada who currently is an accountant.

Madorsky's first and best known role is that of Michael Laemle in Bob Balaban's horror comedy film Parents, starring Randy Quaid, Mary Beth Hurt and Sandy Dennis.

References

External links

Living people
Canadian male child actors
Canadian male film actors
1981 births